The Deportivo CAFESSA Jalisco, commonly known as CAFESSA Jalisco, is a Mexican football club based in Guadalajara. The club was founded in 2015, and currently plays in the Serie A of Liga Premier.

History
Deportivo CAFESSA was founded in 2015 from a Third Division franchise called Cazcanes de Ameca, during its first season it kept the original name. In 2016 it took its current name.

During its first two seasons, the team stayed in Ameca having as its ground the Núcleo Deportivo y de Espectáculos Ameca. In 2017 an agreement was reached with the municipality of Tlajomulco de Zúñiga to move the team to that city.

Before starting the 2017-18 season, it was announced that Deportivo CAFESSA acquired an expansion franchise in Serie B, the fourth professional category in Mexican soccer, at the same time, a reserve team was created to compete in the third division.

From 2019-20 season, Deportivo CAFESSA created a new team which was moved to Estadio Jalisco and plays in Liga Premier – Serie A. The team was able to move from the stadium, after signing an agreement with the Club Jalisco, for this agreement, the club was renamed as Deportivo CAFESSA Jalisco. However, the club maintained Serie B (until 2020) and Liga TDP teams with the name CAFESSA Tlajomulco.

In 2021, the owner of CAFESSA Jalisco put the franchise on hiatus due to the lack of guarantees for a possible future category promotion after the rejection of C.D. Irapuato in the Liga de Expansión MX, in 2022 the franchise was not reactivated, so when the one-year period without activity expired, the club was dissolved.

Players

Current squad

Reserve teams
Deportivo CAFESSA Tlajomulco
Reserve team that plays in the Liga TDP, the fourth level of the Mexican league system.

See also 
 Deportivo CAFESSA Tlajomulco

References

External links 
 Official CAFESSA website

Association football clubs established in 2015
Football clubs in Jalisco
2015 establishments in Mexico
Liga Premier de México